Birthday Gift 2 is a 2000 Filipino drama and erotic film and directed by Cesar S.B. Abella. It's about the incident that's mostly happen during birthday.

Cast
Rey 'PJ' Abellana
Melanie Gomez
Sabrina M.
Fernando Montenegro
Diego Salvador
Abi Zabarte

External links
 

2000 films
Philippine drama films
Philippine erotic films
Filipino-language films
2000s erotic drama films